Following World War II, the Grand Duchy of Luxembourg formulated plans to annex parts of Germany. This was considered as a form of reparations in addition to monetary compensation and employment of workers.

Territorial demands by Luxembourg

The territorial demands of the ruling Luxembourg National Union Government were made known in late summer 1945. Luxembourg required Germany to relinquish German territory that had been separated from the former Duchy of Luxembourg under the terms of the 1815 Congress of Vienna, and the further extension of Luxembourg to the Saar River. Only a portion of the population of Luxembourg was in agreement with these concepts of a "Greater Luxembourg".

In support of this territorial claim, in November 1945 troops of the Grand Duchy of Luxembourg occupied a small zone of their own within the actual French occupation zone, installing two garrisons.

In a memorandum dated November 27, 1946, the Government of Luxembourg stated that the border be relocated between  into German territory. The area constituted approximately 20% of the territory that Luxembourg had ceded to Prussia in 1815.

Similarly to those of Belgium, the Netherlands, and France, these territorial demands were refused by the three primary Allied powers—the US, the United Kingdom, and the USSR—with reference to the considerable problems posed by supplying the needs of the 14 million refugees from the annexed eastern territories of the former Reich who were already present in their respective zones of occupation. The Grand Duchy of Luxembourg nonetheless persisted in its territorial demands.

London Six-Power Conference
Under Article 4 of the London Six-Power Conference of June 7, 1948, "Preliminary Territorial Agreements", the following was noted: "The delegations have agreed to submit to their governments suggestions concerning certain minor provisional territorial adjustments in connection with the western borders of Germany."

The Government of France implemented this decision of the London Conference as follows: under Order No. 212 of the French Military Government of April 23, 1949, the incorporation into the territory of Luxembourg of the Kammerwald together with the settlement of Roth an der Our and the estate of Neuscheuerhof (Bauler) was declared. The area in question consisted of  near the Luxembourg settlement of Vianden.

Shortly thereafter Luxembourg declined to annex Roth and Neuscheuerhof, so that only the uninhabited area of the Kammerwald was separated from Germany.

Return of the territory
In the agreement of July 11, 1959, between the Grand Duchy of Luxembourg and the penitent Federal Republic of Germany, Luxembourg conclusively renounced its claim to the area of the Kammerwald and returned the territory to the Federal Republic of Germany, which in return paid 58.3 million DM to the Grand Duchy of Luxembourg.

See also
Belgian annexation plans after the Second World War
Dutch annexation of German territory after World War II
Recovered Territories
Saar Protectorate

References 

 Bartz, G. Probleme und Aspekte der deutsch-luxemburgischen Grenzvermessung. Trier, 2001 
 Grosbusch, André. "La question des réparations dans l’opinion luxembourgeoise 1945–1949". Hémecht (1984) 569–91 
 Khan, Daniel-Erasmus. Die deutschen Staatsgrenzen. Rechtshistorische Grundlagen und offene Rechtsfragen. Jus publicum: Beiträge zum Öffentlichen Recht 114. Tübingen: Mohr Siebeck, 2004 
 Lengerau, Marc. Les frontières allemandes (1919–1989), Frontières d’Allemagne et en Allemagne: Aspects territoriaux de la question allemande. Contacts, Série IV, Bilans et enjeux 3. Bern/New York: Lang, 1990. p. 70 
 Summa, C. "Wie die heutige deutsch-luxemburgische Grenze im Bereich der Sauer und Our entstand". Landeskundliche Vierteljahrsblätter 1980.2. pp. 62–81 
  GR-Atlas: Kammerwald unter luxemburgische Verwaltung gestellt 
 Order No. 212 of the Commander in Chief of the French Occupying Administration in Germany concerning border adjustments (original text in French and German)

Politics of Luxembourg
Aftermath of World War II in Germany
Allied occupation of Germany
Reparations
Bilateral relations of West Germany
Germany–Luxembourg relations
Germany–Luxembourg border
20th century in Luxembourg
Annexation
History of Luxembourg (1945–present)
History of the Eifel